Procapperia amira is a moth of the family Pterophoridae. It is found in Afghanistan.

The wingspan is 20–21 mm. The forewings are brown. Adults have been recorded in July.

References

Moths described in 1988
Oxyptilini
Moths of Asia